The 1950 Pittsburgh Panthers football team represented the University of Pittsburgh in the 1950 college football season.  The team compiled a 1–8 record under head coach Len Casanova.

Schedule

References

Pittsburgh
Pittsburgh Panthers football seasons
Pittsburgh Panthers football